Ardanovce is a village and municipality with 239 inhabitants in the Topoľčany District of the Nitra Region, Slovakia. In 2011 had the village 223 inhabitants.

Genealogical resources

The records for genealogical research are available at the state archive "Statny Archiv in Nitra, Slovakia"

 Roman Catholic church records (births/marriages/deaths): 1822-1895 (parish A)
 Census records 1869 of Ardanovce are available at the state archive.

See also
 List of municipalities and towns in Slovakia

References

External links
http://en.e-obce.sk/obec/ardanovce/ardanovce.html
http://www.ardanovce.ocu.sk
Surnames of living people in Ardanovce

Villages and municipalities in Topoľčany District